Straight Talk with Ross Mathews (STWR) is a weekly podcast described as "Advice & LOLs from the Gay Best Friend You Wish You Had and Know You Need," hosted by Ross Mathews.  The audio podcast episodes are typically between forty-five minutes to one and one-half hours in length. The show features celebrity interviews, personalized segments, and group discussion on pop culture & current events. The show was first released on November 11, 2014. The show's theme song is "Straight Talk" by Dolly Parton. 

The program features segments including, Press-Conference, Snack Attack!, Nikki B. Trending, Balls Deep with Mr.Malone, Senior Citizens Gay Movie Critic Bill's Movie Reviews,), The Blackness, Gettin’ Saucy with JRod, and more! The show also features specialized segments such as The Straight Talkie Awards, Rapid Fire Kisses, What's under the blanket, Balls Deep With Mr.Malone, Freaky Fagsy, Num That Tune, When did that did it happen , Mrs Straight talk with Ross  and Kiss Kiss & Tell. The show features regulars such as Jillian Barberie, co-hosts such as Malone and Nikki Boyer, and celebrity guests such as Rosie O’Donnell.

References

External links
 

2010s LGBT-related mass media
2014 podcast debuts
American talk radio programs
Comedy and humor podcasts
LGBT-related podcasts
LGBT-related radio programs
Westwood One